John H. Francis III (born 1946) is an American environmentalist nicknamed The Planetwalker. Born in Philadelphia, the son of a West Indian immigrant, he moved to Marin County, California as a young man.  After witnessing the devastation caused by the 1971 San Francisco Bay oil spill, he stopped riding in motorized vehicles, a vow which lasted 22 years from 1972 until 1994. From 1973 until 1990, he also spent 17 years voluntarily silent. During this time he earned a PhD in land management and traveled extensively, walking across the entire width of the lower 48  states of the USA as well as walking to South America.

Early Life
Francis was born in Philadelphia, Pennsylvania in 1946 to parents La Java and John. He grew up in the city with his brother Dwayne and often spent summers at his aunt and uncle's farm in Virginia, helping them work the land and grow their own food. Francis moved to Marin County, California in the 1960s.

Silent Period
On January 17, 1971, two oil tankers owned by Standard Oil Company, the Arizona Standard and Oregon Standard, collided in San Francisco Bay, creating an enormous oil spill of 840,000 gallons. After seeing the damage caused, John Francis joked with a friend about never riding in a car again. The following year, a neighbor of Francis' died suddenly. Faced with a new sense of the uncertainty of life, Francis decided to act immediately and for the next 22 years refused to ride in motorized vehicles. Francis describes himself as having had an over-inflated sense of self-importance at this time and says that he initially expected other people to follow his example and also forgo automobiles and other powered vehicles.

As Francis traveled about on foot, people would sometimes stop to talk about what he was doing, and he often found himself arguing with them, as well as with friends and acquaintances, about his decision to go on foot. On his birthday in 1973, Francis decided to stop speaking as a gift to his community, to not argue for one day and instead listen to what others had to say. He found this so valuable that he continued to be silent the next day. This continued and he ended up not speaking for 17 years, with the exception of a phone call to his mother after 10 years of silence. During this time, he communicated by writing and gestures, and also expressed himself by playing the banjo. He ended his vow of silence on Earth Day in 1990. The following day, while in Washington, D.C. he was struck by a car. He managed to convince the ambulance crew to allow him to walk to the hospital.

Education 
While he was silent, Francis completed three college degrees. In 1971, Francis walked to Ashland, Oregon to enroll in Southern Oregon University where he completed a bachelor of science degree in 1981 with credit given for life experience.

Francis then contacted the University of Montana to apply to their graduate environmental studies master's program, letting them know he would not arrive for about two years. During that time, he walked to the state of Washington, built a boat, and walked and sailed to Montana where he completed his master's degree two years later. With little money, he audited classes but professors tracked his grades, and when funds became available to pay for the classes he had taken, they were put on his transcript for credit. As is common with graduate students, Francis taught classes while studying for his master's degree.

Francis then walked to Wisconsin, where he earned a PhD in 1991 in Land Resources from the Nelson Institute for Environmental Studies at the University of Wisconsin-Madison. During his studies, the Exxon Valdez disaster occurred, which brought attention to his research on the effects of oil spills. After completing his degree, he walked to Washington D.C.

Career 
In 1990 after finishing his degrees, Francis worked for the  United States Coast Guard in Washington D.C where he wrote oil spill regulations following the Exxon Valdez disaster in Alaska. Francis received the U.S. Department of Transportation's Public Service Commendation in recognition of his efforts. In 1991, he was appointed United Nations Environmental Program Goodwill ambassador to the World's Grassroots Communities. In 1994, Francis decided he could be a more effective environmentalist if he began to again use motorized transportation. At the border of Venezuela and Brazil, he boarded a bus.

Francis is a founder and program director of Planetwalk, a non-profit environmental awareness organization. In 2005, he published Planetwalker: How to Change Your World One Step at a Time (later republished by the National Geographic Society as Planetwalker: 17 Years of Silence, 22 Years of Walking). In 2010, Francis also became the first ever National Geographic Society Education Fellow and the National Geographic Society published his work The Ragged Edge of Silence: Finding Peace in a Noisy World.

In 2009 he was in Australia, walking the Great Ocean Road for a film being made by Tourism Victoria.

From 2011-2012, Francis was a visiting associate professor at the Nelson Institute for Environmental Studies at the University of Wisconsin-Madison.

Francis is a former commissioner of West Cape May, New Jersey. He currently lives near Point Reyes Station, California and continues to organize planetwalks around the world.

References

 Francis, J., Planetwalker: How to Change Your World One Step at a Time, Elephant Mountain Press, (Point Reyes Station), 2005.

External links
 planetwalk.org
 Tour Tales
 Grist.Org interview
 
"Walk the earth ... my 17-year vow of silence" (TED2008)
“Cambridge Forum; WGBH Forum Network; John Francis: Planetwalker; 4134-2008_05_14.mov,” 2008-05-14, WGBH, American Archive of Public Broadcasting (GBH and the Library of Congress), Boston, MA and Washington, DC, accessed June 7, 2021

1946 births
Living people
Activists from Philadelphia
American environmentalists
Writers from Philadelphia
Southern Oregon University alumni
Silence
Nautilus Book Award winners
20th-century American writers
21st-century American writers
20th-century African-American writers
21st-century African-American writers
African-American environmentalists